Light Italian CubeSat for Imaging of Asteroids (LICIACube) is a six-unit CubeSat of the Italian Space Agency (ASI). LICIACube is a part of the Double Asteroid Redirection Test (DART) mission and carries out observational analysis of the Didymos asteroid binary system after DART's impact on Dimorphos. LICIACube is the first purely Italian autonomous spacecraft in deep space. Data archiving and processing is managed by the Space Science Data Center (SSDC) of the ASI.

History 
LICIACube is the first deep space mission developed and autonomously managed by an Italian team. To collaborate upon the design, integration, and testing of the CubeSat, the Italian Space Agency selected the aerospace company Argotec, while the LICIACube GS has a complex architecture based on a mission control center in Turin hosted by Argotec and science operation center in Rome. Antennas of the NASA Deep Space Network (NASA DSN) and data archiving and processing is managed at the ASI SSDC. The scientific team making this cubesat is led by National Institute of Astrophysics INAF (OAR, IAPS, OAA, OAPd, OATs) with the support of IFAC-CNR and Parthenope University of Naples. The team is supported by the University of Bologna for orbit determination and satellite navigation and the Polytechnic University of Milan, for mission analysis and optimisation. The LICIACube team includes the wider Italian scientific community involved in the definition of all the aspects of the mission: trajectory design; mission definition (and real-time orbit determination during operations); impact, plume and imaging simulation, and modelling, in preparation of a suitable framework for the analysis and interpretation of in situ data. Major technological challenges during the mission (autonomous targeting and imaging of such a small body during a fast flyby with the limited resources of a CubeSat) is affordable thanks to cooperation between the mentioned teams in support of the engineering tasks.

Satellite design 
In order to deal with the mission, the Argotec platform uses an autonomous navigation system, two light solar arrays, an integrated propulsion system with thrusters of 50mN thrust and isp of 40s, two cameras, an X-band communication system, and an advanced on-board computer.

Scientific payload 
LICIACube is equipped with two optical cameras for conducting asteroidal reconnaissance during flyby, dubbed LEIA (LICIACube Explorer Imaging for Asteroid), a Catadioptric camera, a narrow field of view (FoV) of  2.06°, 25 microradian/pixel, 2048x2048 pixels, monochrome, achieving a best resolution of 1.38 m/pix at closest approach) camera, and LUKE (LICIACube Unit Key Explorer), a wide 5° FoV imaging camera with an RGB Bayer pattern infrared filter. These captured scientific data revealing the composition of the asteroid and provided data for its autonomous system by finding and tracking the asteroid throughout the encounter. As it was released when DART sped up for its intentional impact, it took an image every 6 seconds during DART's impact period. It had preliminary flyby targets including taking 3 high resolution images revealing the asteroid's morphology concentrating on the physics of the asteroid and plume generations after impact. This may help characterise the consequences of the impact.

Mission profile

Launch 
LICIACube was manufactured in Italy and sent to Applied Physics Laboratory (APL) of Johns Hopkins University in September 2021. On 8 September 2021, the LICIACube was integrated into the DART spacecraft for launch on 24 November 2021, at 06:21:02 UTC, inside a spring-loaded box placed on the wall of the DART spacecraft.

Goals 
LICIACube's goals are to:
 Document the effect of DART's impact on the secondary member of the 65803 Didymos binary asteroid system
 Characterise the shape of the target
 Perform dedicated scientific investigations on it

Cruise phase and flyby 

After the launch, the Cubesat remained enclosed within a spring-loaded box and piggybacks with the DART spacecraft for almost the entire duration of DART's mission. It separated on 11 September 2022 from DART by being ejected at roughly  relative to DART, 15 days before impact. After release, as part of the testing process to calibrate the miniature spacecraft and its cameras, LICIACube captured images of a crescent Earth and the Pleiades star cluster, also known as the Seven Sisters.

It conducted 3 orbital manoeuvrers for its final trajectory, which flew it past Dimorphos about 2 minutes 45 seconds after DART’s impact. That slight delay allowed LICIACube to confirm impact, observe the plume’s evolution, potentially capture images of the newly formed impact crater, and view the opposite hemisphere of Dimorphos that DART never saw, while drifting past the asteroid.

Mission after flyby 
After the flyby, it spends a few weeks time sending the data back to Earth. Depending on its status and remaining propellant, it can potentially do another visit to one of these asteroids:
 2000 YA on 30 March 2023
  on 29 April 2023
  on 9 November 2023
 2019 XS on 16 November 2023
 2014 CC14 on 19 April 2024
 2016 JC6 on 15 May 2024
 14827 Hypnos (1986 JK) on 3 June 2024

Results 

Several images have been transmitted to Earth showing rays of impact debris streaming from Dimorphos. 
On 28 September 2022, the first images of the impact from the LICIACube probe were published on a NASA web page.

Gallery

See also

References 

Planetary defense
Missions to asteroids
Solar System Exploration program
SpaceX commercial payloads
Spacecraft launched in 2021
CubeSats
NASA space probes
2021 in California